Mykola Karpyuk (Mykola Andronovych Karpyuk) is a Ukrainian political activist and former vice leader of the UNA-UNSO as well as a member of the central council of the Right Sector.  In May 2016, Karpyuk was accused of participating in the First Chechen War and sentenced to 22.5 years in prison. Russian civil rights society Memorial recognized him as a political prisoner.

Biography 
Karpyuk was the chairman of the Rivne cell of the Ukrainian National Assembly. In 1992, he participated in the Transnistria War on the side of Transnistria and in the War in Abkhazia, in 1993, he fought on the side of Georgia. He took part in the Ukrainian parliamentary elections of 1998 and 2002 for UNA-UNSO, but the party did not go to the Verkhovna Rada both times.

In 2001-2002, there was a split within the UNA-UNSO. At the congress in November 2001, Mykola Karpyuk was elected as the new chairman of the UNA-UNSO. In 2000-2001, he took part in the action “Ukraine without Kuchma”, because of which he was arrested and sentenced to 4.5 years in prison. In 2004 he was released from prison. During the Euromaidan Karpyuk joined the organization Right Sector and became a leading figure within the organization.

Arrest and detention 
Karpyuk was kidnapped on the Russian-Ukrainian border in 2014 and arrested, according to his family. After his arrest, Mykola Karpyuk, along with another Ukrainian detainee in Russia, Stanislav Klykh, was charged with participation in hostilities during the First Chechen War on the side of the Chechen Republic of Ichkeria, attempted murder, and killings of servicemen of the armed forces of Russia in 1994-1995. The charges were based on the testimony of Alexander Malofeev, who was sentenced to 24.5 years of imprisonment, who allegedly was a member of the Viking detachment. Klykh and Karpyuk themselves denied visiting Chechnya.

Amnesty International has called the trial against Karpyuk and Klykh unfair. Karpuk and Klykh were denied access to lawyers, and alleged that they were tortured while imprisoned. In 2018, Lyudmyla Denisova, the Commissioner for Human Rights in Ukraine, was denied visiting access to Karpyuk and fellow political prisoner Oleg Sentsov.

Released with swap  
Mykola Karpyuk was released with swap between Russia and Ukraine, 35 prisoners to 35, on September 7, 2019. When the plane with 35 freed Ukrainians landed in Kyiv, they were met by president Volodymyr Zelensky and relatives.

References

1964 births
2014 controversies
People from Rivne Oblast
Far-right politics in Ukraine
Living people
People of the Euromaidan
Pro-Ukrainian people of the 2014 pro-Russian unrest in Ukraine
Prisoners and detainees of Russia
Ukrainian people imprisoned abroad
Ukrainian people taken hostage
Ukrainian victims of human rights abuses
Political prisoners according to Memorial
Ukrainian nationalists